Telstar 9 was a Telstar series geostationary communication satellite that was scheduled to be built by Space Systems/Loral and was planned to be released in 2004, but the construction was eventually canceled.

References 

Telstar satellites